Kevin E. Bassler is an American physicist, currently the John and Rebecca Moores Professor of Physics and Mathematics at the University of Houston.

In 2014, Bassler was elected a Fellow of the American Physical Society "for seminal and sustained contributions to the understanding of the dynamics of complex systems, particularly concerning non-equilibrium phase transitions, emergent behavior, and dynamics in adaptive networks."

References

External links

Year of birth missing (living people)
Living people
University of Houston faculty
21st-century American physicists
Carnegie Mellon University alumni
Fellows of the American Physical Society